The 2011–12 Segunda Divisão season was the 78th season since its establishment. União da Madeira were the defending champions.

Zona Norte

Zona Centro

Stadia and locations

League table

Zona Sul

Play-offs

Top goalscorers

References

Portuguese Second Division seasons
Port
3